Lekhwair (also spelled as Al Khuwair) is a district in Qatar, located in the municipality of Ad Dawhah. It is close to the West Bay district.

The Khalifa International Tennis and Squash Complex is situated in Lekhwair.

Gallery

References

Communities in Doha